TTS-IS (Russian Тяжелый транспортный самолет интегральной схемы (ТТС-ИС), heavy transport aircraft integrated circuit (HTA-IC)) is a project by TsAGI for a very large wing-in-ground-effect, lifting-body cargo aircraft with a take-off weight of 1000 tons, a payload of 500 tons, with a flight range of over 6000 km, a cruising speed of 500 km / h. As with the Airbus A380 and the Boeing 747-8, the aircraft is designed to land at airports that meet the Aerodrome Reference Code code 4F standard of the International Civil Aviation Organization (ICAO). It is also notable for the use of liquefied natural gas (LNG) as its aviation fuel source, and for the use of intermodal containers that are standardized in train, ship, and truck freight instead of the smaller unit load devices that are common in air freight transportation.

Also called Heavy Cargo Aircraft with Lifting Body (HCA-LB), the aircraft is the result of work beginning in 2014 as a proposal by TsAGI under a Russian government contract. The HCA-LB was formally introduced to the public in January 2017, and it began wind tunnel testing in 2018. The aircraft is targeting for a service entry in the 2030s or later. It carries twenty-foot equivalent units (TEUs) in four rows of six containers side by side on the port and starboard parts of the aircraft, for a total capacity of 48 TEUs. The two cargo areas are separated by an insulated fuel tank stretching the length of the center fuselage, holding cryogenic liquefied natural gas (LNG). The HCA-LB is nominally powered by a row of four turboprop engines positioned behind the cargo, atop the fuselage in a pusher configuration, although the propulsion method will be investigated with greater detail in the future. The HCA-LB has a pi-tail empennage, with the twin vertical tails extending from near the back outer corners of the cargo sections. Outboard of the cargo sections are non-cargo bearing, shorter, thinner swept wings with downward-pointing wingtips.

The HCA-LB is similar in configuration to the Boeing Model 754.

Specifications

See also

References

Soviet and Russian cargo aircraft
Proposed aircraft of Russia
Lifting bodies
Ekranoplans
Four-engined pusher aircraft